Luddington railway station was a station in Luddington, Lincolnshire on the Axholme Joint Railway branch to Fockerby.

References

Disused railway stations in the Borough of North Lincolnshire
Former Axholme Joint Railway stations
Railway stations in Great Britain opened in 1903
Railway stations in Great Britain closed in 1933